Ahmad Hassan Dani (Urdu: احمد حسن دانی) FRAS, SI, HI (20 June 1920 – 26 January 2009) was a Pakistani archaeologist, historian, and linguist. He was among the foremost authorities on Central Asian and South Asian archaeology and history. He introduced archaeology as a discipline in higher education in Pakistan and Bangladesh. Throughout his career, Dani held various academic positions and international fellowships, apart from conducting archaeological excavations and research. He is particularly known for archaeological work on pre-Indus civilization and Gandhara sites in Northern Pakistan.

Biography

Early life 
Ahmad Hasan Dani, from an ethnic Kashmiri Muslim family of traders from the Wain clan, was born on 20 June 1920 in Basna, British India. He graduated in 1944, with an MA degree in Sanskrit, to become the first Muslim graduate of Banaras Hindu University. He scored highest marks in the exams which earned him a gold medal. This also qualified him for a teaching fellowship from the same university. Although he was provided with the grant, he was not allowed to teach owing to his religious beliefs. He stayed there for six months. In 1945, he started working as a trainee in archaeology under the guidance of Mortimer Wheeler. At this time, he participated in excavations at Taxila and Mohenjo-daro.

Career 
After the Partition of India, Dani migrated to East Pakistan. There, between 1947 and 1949, he worked as assistant superintendent of the Department of Archaeology. At this time, he rectified the Varendra Museum at Rajshahi. In 1949, he married Safiya Sultana. Together, they had three sons (Anis, Navaid and Junaid) and a daughter (Fauzia). In 1950, Dani was promoted to the position of superintendent-in-charge of archaeology. In the same year, he became general secretary of Asiatic Society of Pakistan in Dhaka. Later on, in 1955, he took the position of president, National Committee for Museums in Pakistan. For a period of twelve years (between 1950 and 1962), Dani remained associate professor of history at University of Dhaka, while at the same time working as curator at Dhaka museum. During this period, he carried out archaeological research on the Muslim history of Bengal.

Dani moved to the University of Peshawar in 1962, where he created the Department of Archaeology and remained as a professor until 1971. During this time, he led the resetting and renovation works for the Lahore and Peshawar Museums. He became chairman of Research Society in University of Peshawar in 1970. In 1971, he moved to University of Islamabad to become dean of Faculty of Social Sciences. He left the post in 1975 to concentrate on research as professor of history. Meanwhile, the university was renamed Quaid-e-Azam University in 1976. He continued to work in various positions until his retirement in 1980 when he was made emeritus professor. During this period, he also served as president of the Archaeological and Historical Association of Pakistan (1979) and co-director of the Pak-German Team for Ethnology Research in Northern Areas of Pakistan (1980).

He received an honorary doctorate from Tajikistan University, (Dushanbe) in 1993. During the same year, Dani established the Islamabad Museum. Between 1992 and 1996, he was appointed advisor to the Ministry of Culture of Pakistan, on archaeology. Between 1994 and 1998, he remained chairman of the National Fund for Cultural Heritage in Islamabad. In 1997, Dani became honorary director at the Taxila Institute of Asian Civilizations. He held the position until the time of his death.

On 22 January 2009, he was admitted to Pakistan Institute of Medical Sciences in Islamabad with heart, kidney and diabetes problems. He died on 26 January 2009 at the age of 88 years.

Visiting, research and honorary positions 
During his associate professorship at Dhaka University, Dani worked as a research fellow at the School of Oriental and African Studies, University of London (1958–59). Later, in 1969 he became Asian Fellow at the Australian National University, Canberra. In 1974, he went to the University of Pennsylvania in Philadelphia as a visiting scholar. In 1977, he was visiting professor at the University of Wisconsin–Madison. Over the span of his career, Dani was awarded honorary fellowships of Royal Asiatic Society of Bangladesh (1969), German Archaeological Institute (1981), Istituto Italiano per l'Africa e l'Oriente (IsMEO) (1986) and Royal Asiatic Society (1991).

In 1991, Dani was made honorary citizen of Bukhara and honorary member of Paivand Society in Tajikistan. He was made honorary life patron of Al-Shifa Trust, Rawalpindi in 1993.

Research contributions 

Dani remained engaged in excavation works on the pre-Indus civilization site of Rehman Dheri in Northern Pakistan. He also made a number of discoveries of Gandhara sites in Peshawar and Swat Valleys, and worked on Indo-Greek sites in Dir. From 1985, he was involved in research focusing on the documentation of the rock carvings and inscriptions on ancient remains from the Neolithic age in the high mountain region of Northern Pakistan along with Harald Hauptmann of Heidelberg Academy of Sciences, University of Heidelberg. He also led the UNESCO teams for the Desert Route Expedition of the Silk Road in China (1990) and the Steppe Route Expedition of the Silk Road in the Soviet Union(1991).

From his extensive fieldwork and research experience, Dani refuted any influence of South Indian culture on the Indus Valley civilization. Using a geographic perspective of the socio-political systems and cultural distribution of the Indus Basin and surrounding hinterland, he observed that the Indo-Gangetic Plain did not play any significant role in the development of Indus Valley culture. Nor was there any invasion from the seaside during the Bronze Age, although the coastline facilitated maritime trade. The major influence, according to Dani, came from Central Asia in the west. He asserted that the hilly western borderland that appears as a boundary to the external eye is actually a network of hill plateaus where the local people have always moved freely. He therefore argued that the cultural history of Pakistan is more closely related to Central Asia through Buddhist, Persian and later Sufism influences.

Dani maintained that despite the Arabian Sea allowing the Meluhhans to establish trade relations with Mesopotamia and Ancient Egypt, the majority of historical movements occurred between Central and South Asia. The geographic location as a link between the two regions has characterised the relationship "between the people of Pakistan and those of Central Asia in the field of culture, language, literature, food, dress, furniture and folklore".

Awards and honours 
Despite being the first Muslim student of Banaras Hindu University, Dani also scored highest in the graduation exams and received the J. K. Gold Medal from that university in 1944. Among the national awards, Dani received Sitara-e-Imtiaz in 1969, Aizaz-e-Kamal in 1992 and Hilal-e-Imtiaz in 2000 from the Government of Pakistan. In 2004, he was awarded the title of 'Distinguished National Professor' by the Higher Education Commission in recognition of his contributions and achievements.

Internationally, his services in archaeology, linguistics and ancient history were commended through various prestigious honours and awards such as:
 2000 Hilal-e-Imtiaz (Crescent of Excellence) Award, Government of Pakistan
 1998 Légion d'honneur, President of the French Republic
 1997 Aristotle Silver Medal, UNESCO
 1996 Order of the Merit, Government of Germany
 1994 Knight Commander, Government of Italy
 1990 Palmes Academiques, Government of France
 1986 Gold Medal, Asiatic Society of Bangladesh
 1969 Sitara-i-Imtiaz (Star of Excellence) Award by the Government of Pakistan

Publications 
Ahmad Hasan Dani had more than 30 published books and numerous journal articles to his credit. He spoke 35 languages and dialects, and was fluent in Bengali, French, Hindi, Kashmiri, Marathi, Pashto, Persian, Punjabi, Sanskrit, Seraiki, Sindhi, Tamil, Turkish and Urdu languages. He also published various texts in most of these languages.

Books 
 History of Pakistan: Pakistan through ages. Sang-e-Meel Publications. 2007. 
 Historic City of Taxila. Sang-e-Meel Publications. 2001. 
 History of Northern Areas of Pakistan (Up to 2000 AD). Sang-e-Meel Publications. 2001. 
 Romance of the Khyber Pass. Sang-e-Meel Publications. 1997. 
 New Light on Central Asia. Sang-e-Meel Publications. 1996. 
 Central Asia Today. Sang-e-Meel Publications. 1996. 
 Human Records on Karakorum Highway. Sang-e-Meel Publications. 1995. 
 Peshawar: Historic City of the Frontier. Sang-e-Meel Publications, (2nd Revised edition). 1995. 
 A Short History of Pakistan, Book One: Pre-Muslim Period. University of Karachi. (3 editions, 1967, 1984, 1992). 
 History of Northern Areas of Pakistan (Historical studies). National Institute of Historical and Cultural Research. 1989. 
 Perspectives of Pakistan. National Institute of Pakistan Studies, Quaid-e-Azam University. 1989. ASIN B0000CQNUB
 The historic city of Taxila. Centre for East Asian Cultural Studies. 1986. 
 Chilas: The City of Nanga Parvat (Dyamar). 1983. ASIN B0000CQDB2
 Thatta: Islamic architecture. Institute of Islamic History, Culture & Civilization. 1982. ASIN B0000CQD43
 Indus civilization: New Perspectives. Quaid-i-Azam University, Islamabad. 1981
 Alberuni's Indica: A record of the cultural history of South Asia about A.D. 1030. University of Islamabad Press, Islamabad. 1973
 Indian palaeography. Clarendon P. 1963. ASIN B0000CM0CB
 Dacca: A record of its changing fortunes. S.S. Dani (Publisher). 1962. ASIN B0000CQXMU
 Prehistory and Protohistory of Eastern India: With a Detailed Account of the Neolithic Cultures. K.L. Mukhopadhyay. 1960
 Bibliography of the Muslim Inscriptions of Bengal. 1957

Co-authored works 
 With J-P. Mohen (eds.), History of Humanity, Volume III, From the Third Millennium to the Seventh Century BC. New York: Routledge/Paris: UNESCO. 1996. .
 With V.M. Masson (eds.), History of Civilizations of Central Asia, Unesco, Paris. 1992- (6 volumes)  (v.1)

See also 
 Sindhology

References

External links 
 Dani's Profile at National Fund for Cultural Heritage, Pakistan.

1920 births
2009 deaths
Alumni of the University of London
Banaras Hindu University alumni
Fellows of the Royal Asiatic Society
Pakistani archaeologists
Pakistani people of Kashmiri descent
Pakistani scholars of Pakistan studies
Pakistani scientists
Academic staff of Quaid-i-Azam University
Recipients of Hilal-i-Imtiaz
Recipients of the Legion of Honour
Recipients of the Order of Merit of the Federal Republic of Germany
Recipients of Sitara-i-Imtiaz
Academic staff of the University of Dhaka
Academic staff of the University of Peshawar
20th-century archaeologists